Adib Farhadi (born 1972) is an assistant professor at University of South Florida and coordinator of USF's Executive Education Program. Farhadi is a former Afghanistan Deputy Minister of Commerce.

Early life and education
Farhadi was born in Kabul, Afghanistan and raised in Greenville, North Carolina, where he attended Rose High School. Farhadi earned his B.S. Degree at East Carolina University in 1994, his master's degree at New York University in 1996 and his Ph.D. in economy at University of Canberra in 2014. Farhadi completed his doctoral thesis, "Stabilization for Sustainable Economic Growth in Fragile States: The Case for a Trade-Based Regional Economic Integration Silk Road Strategy" under the supervision of Professor Mark Evans. Farhadi completed a post-doctoral fellowship at University of Canberra's Institute for Governance & Policy Analysis.

Professional work
As of 2016, Farhadi is an assistant professor, director of economic development and governance at Global Initiatives and coordinator of executive education program at University of South Florida. In 2012 Farhadi was a visiting scholar at Johns Hopkins University, School of Advanced International Studies (SAIS). Farhadi has championed targeting aid for Afghans to what the Afghan themselves need rather than the donors' preferences, as he had in 2012 while a researcher with the Australia New Zealand School of Government's Institute for Governance (ANZIG).
Circa 2002, Farhadi served as the executive director of Afghanistan National Development Strategy, director of Economic Affairs in the Ministry of Foreign Affairs, Deputy Minister of Commerce & Industry, Chief Negotiator for WTO accession and senior advisor to the New Silk Road Initiative for the Afghan government. Furthermore, the USF Global Initiative for Civil Society and Conflict, a think tank under which he was one of two employees, was shuttered during his tenure there due to an "unclear mission statement, confusion over who the director was and a lack of accountability over the use of funds". Internal US Government correspondence obtained by WikiLeaks revealed the US State Department considered Farhadi "a western-educated technocrat who commands a great deal of respect within the donor community for his commitment to transparency, efficiency and donor coordination."

Farhadi has been recognized by the Afghanistan Government, the United Nations and Italian Government for his work on the Afghanistan's Millennium Development Goals. and Afghanistan National Development Strategy (ANDS)

Partial bibliography

References

External links

American people of Afghan descent
Afghan government officials
New York University alumni
East Carolina University alumni
University of Canberra alumni
University of South Florida faculty
1972 births
Living people